Simethis is a genus of plants in the family Asphodelaceae, subfamily Hemerocallidoideae. It contains only one known species, Simethis mattiazzii, commonly called the Kerry lily.

It grows in dry places especially near the coast in Western Europe (Ireland, France, Spain, Portugal, Italy) and northern Africa (Algeria, Morocco, Tunisia). Its common name is based on its occurrence at a few sites in County Kerry, Ireland.

Description
It has a vertical rhizome and fleshy roots. The inflorescence is a sparsely-branched, erect, wiry stem bearing a few small leaves and a loose spike of three to ten flowers with six tepals. The six stamens have fuzzy white filaments tipped by yellow anthers. The fruit is a three-lobed capsule. The Kerry lily flowers in May and June.

Distribution and habitat
The Kerry lily has a scattered, mainly maritime, distribution in Western Europe and North Africa. The only place in the British Isles where it is found is in County Kerry in southwestern Ireland, where it is restricted to a  area around Derrynane. It occurs in western France, the Pyrenees, the Atlantic coastal strip of northern and western Spain and Portugal, the Mediterranean coastal strip of Morocco, Algeria and Tunisia, and isolated sites in western Italy, Sicily, Corsica  and Sardinia. In different parts of its range it inhabits grassland and heathland habitats, maquis, shrubland and cork-oak woodland. It is common in the Atlantic belt of Europe but rare in many of the other scattered locations in which it grows.

This plant has a relictual distribution, with southwestern Ireland being its most northerly occurrence. It was recorded from Dorset in southern England, but seems to now be extinct there. It is more common in Brittany and the Loire Valley, and the northern flanks of the Pyrenees but much rarer further inland. It is also common in the coastal strip of the Iberian Peninsula, and was discovered growing on the island of Marettimo, Sicily, for the first time in 2012. The population in North Africa is very fragmentary.

References

External links
 Interactive Flora of NW Europe

Hemerocallidoideae
Monotypic Asphodelaceae genera
Flora of Europe
Flora of North Africa